"Through da Storm" is a song by American rapper Polo G from his debut studio album Die a Legend (2019). It was produced by Ayo.

Composition
The song is built around a "toy piano-like tune", while lyrically Polo G reflects on going down the wrong path but eventually changing for the better and reaching fame, as well as the new life he is enjoying.

Critical reception
Tosten Burks of Spin regarded "Through da Storm" as perhaps the best track from Die a Legend.

Music video
The music video was directed by Ryan Lynch and released on July 14, 2019. In it, Polo G performs in front of a group of ballerinas and a fountain in a park in Los Angeles. Shots of the streets of L.A. at night and the California mountains are also included.

Charts

Certifications

References

2019 songs
Polo G songs
Songs written by Polo G